Comactinia is a genus of crinoids, characteristically with 10 arms, belonging to the family Comatulidae. There are three described species, two from the western Atlantic and one, Comactinia titan, recently described from the western Pacific.

References

Comatulidae
Crinoid genera
Taxa named by Austin Hobart Clark